Simbo is an island in Solomon Islands; it is located in the Western Province. It was known to early Europeans as Eddystone Island.

Geography
Simbo is actually two main islands, one small island called Nusa Simbo separated by a saltwater lagoon from a larger one. Collectively the islands are known to the local people as Mandegugusu, while in the rest of the Solomons the islands are referred to as Simbo. Simbo has an active volcano called Ove as well several saltwater lagoons and a freshwater lake.

Earthquake
On April 2, 2007, Simbo was hit by a massive earthquake and tsunami which is now known as the 2007 Solomon Islands earthquake. A 12 m tsunami destroyed two villages on the northern side of the island and killed 10 people.

In popular culture
Some of the historic cultural practices on Simbo are referenced in The Ghost Road, a novel by Pat Barker about World War I. The author used the research of Arthur Maurice Hocart and the psychoanalyst William Rivers.

References

Islands of the Solomon Islands
Western Province (Solomon Islands)